YolanDa Faye Brown  (born 4 October 1982) is a British saxophonist, composer, and broadcaster. Her musical sound is a fusion of reggae, jazz and soul. In 2022 she was appointed chair of the British Phonographic Industry (BPI).

Early life and education
Brown was born to Jamaican parents (her mother was a headteacher, while her father was an advertising executive) in Barking, Essex, England. She grew up in Gants Hill in the London Borough of Redbridge. Her childhood dream was to become a racing car driver.

Brown was a student at Bancroft's School and Beal High School, where she became Head Girl. Brown went on to study at the University of Kent, Kent Business School in Canterbury. She also spent a year as an Erasmus student at the University of Oviedo in Asturias, Spain.

Her master's dissertation was on "Combining SSM (Soft systems methodology) and DESM (Discrete event simulation)". She graduated with a first-class degree. Brown gained a further master's degree in Methods of Social Research, followed by four years of Ph.D. study in management science, before taking a hiatus from her thesis on "Multi Methodology" to pursue her music career.

Career
In 2008, Brown was a MOBO "Best Jazz"  and UMA winner.

In 2009, Brown became the first musician to not only be nominated in the "Best Jazz" category of the MOBOs in consecutive years, but also the first to win it two years running.

Brown has collaborated with many artists, including Billy Ocean, Jools Holland, Grammy Award-winners Morgan Heritage, Lemar, Michelle Williams of Destiny's Child, reggae legend Bob Marley's son Julian Marley, Matt Cardle, Shingai Shoniwa of the Noisettes, The Floacist from the duo Floetry, Mica Paris, Omar Lye-Fook and Wretch 32. She has toured with Diana Krall, Errol Brown, Beverley Knight and The Temptations.

Brown is a Yamaha Artist and was appointed the UK's Class Band Ambassador in February 2011. Yamaha Class Band is a whole-class wind band teaching method, which piloted up until July 2012, in a collaboration between Yamaha UK and two of the UK's leading music services.

In February 2012, Brown released her first album April Showers May Flowers. That year, she also kicked off a UK and overseas tour in support of the album with two benchmark concerts at the HMV Hammersmith Apollo accompanied by her full band and the Royal Philharmonic Concert Orchestra. It was featured as an album of the year on the UK iTunes "Best Jazz Album of 2012" list.

Brown's second album entitled Love Politics War was released on 16 June 2017. The album features original compositions blending reggae, jazz and soul, labelled somewhat tongue-in-cheek as "Posh Reggae". It was her first album to be made available not only as a CD and download but also on vinyl.

In January 2017, Brown was named as the celebrity ambassador for the Greater London Assembly and ABRSM "Learn Music London" Campaign. During 2017, she toured her new album at home and abroad, as well as performed on a special British Airways flight to New Orleans for Mardi Gras to inaugurate the airline's new service to that city.

In the same year, Brown was also a presenter on several television programmes transmitted as a part of the BBC Proms offerings, including a special Proms tribute to jazz greats Ella Fitzgerald and Dizzy Gillespie, in the centenary year of their births and the Last Night of the Proms from Around the UK. Television exposure continued into 2018 to include programmes on the BBC's Celebrity Eggheads and Celebrity Mastermind. In November of that year, Brown also co-presented the BBC Young Jazz Musician finals, which was transmitted on BBC Four.

In January 2018, Brown embarked on a world tour to celebrate 10 years in music. Her tour covered many new territories, including Australia, Martinique, Barbados, Morocco, Germany and Spain.

Brown's 20 episode BBC series, YolanDa's Band Jam began transmission on CBeebies on 26 January 2019. The show consists of Brown inviting star guests to play along with a live audience of children aged five to seven.

On New Year's Eve 2019, she appeared on the BBC's Jools' Annual Hootenanny, performing "I Put a Spell on You" with Kelly Jones and "Ain't Too Proud to Beg" with Rick Astley.

The Department of Education and DCMS in 2021, invited Brown to sit on the advisory panel for the National Plan for Music Education (NPME), published in June 2022 to positive response.

In June 2022, she was appointed by the Secretary of State Nadine Dorries, as National Council Member at Arts Council England

In July 2022, Brown was appointed chair of the British Phonographic Industry (BPI).

October 2022 saw YolanDa receive a BAFTA nomination in the Best Presenter category.

In November 2022, YolanDa Brown won the Music Week Women in Music “Music Champion” Award and even received a congratulatory video message from Sesame Street’s Elmo

Charity

In January 2018, Brown was appointed Chair of Youth Music, a national charity investing in music-making projects for children and young people experiencing challenging circumstances. She was the keynote speaker at Music Mark – the biggest music education conference held annually in the UK – in November 2018.

Since 2017, Brown has been a BBC Music Ambassador. She is also a celebrity ambassador for The Prince's Trust, Children & the Arts, Plan UK, World Child Cancer and London Music Fund.

The YolanDa Brown Music Award in conjunction with the University of East London (UEL) provides financial support specifically to final-year students studying BSc (Hons) Music Technology or BA (Hons) Music Production and Culture at UEL.  The award is available to up to four UEL students and provides them with funds toward studio time or music equipment. This was the first project from the YolanDa Brown Foundation.

The Drake YolanDa Award has been created to support emerging artists across the UK on their musical journey. Philanthropist and entrepreneur James Drake and YolanDa Brown will award artists who express a commitment to their careers and demonstrate creative excellence and a drive to succeed.

In May 2018, Brown launched the London Saxophone Festival, an annual celebration of the saxophone through concerts, film, workshops and more. Featured artists included Bob Reynolds from Snarky Puppy and Casey Benjamin from the Robert Glasper Experiment. The second edition took place in June 2019 and the 2020 edition was postponed as a result of COVID-19.

Broadcast work
Brown is a regular guest presenter on BBC Radio 4's programme Loose Ends with Clive Anderson  She also presented a documentary on Williams Syndrome for the station. She has two radio shows running on British Airways flights across the world called Inflight Live Sessions and The Gospel Show' 

Brown has made several appearances on television at home and abroad including BBC Breakfast (BBC One), The Wright Stuff (Channel 5), Sunday Brunch (Channel 4), Songs of Praise (BBC One), Vintage TV Sessions (Vintage TV), Let's Go Club (CBeebies) and Newsnight.

Brown's role as a television presenter in 2017 saw her fronting several television programmes transmitted as a part of the BBC Proms offerings that year, including a special Proms tribute to jazz greats Ella Fitzgerald and Dizzy Gillespie, in the centenary year of their births and The Last Night of the Proms from Around the UK. She also presented an episode of Vintage Sessions on Vintage TV.

During 2018, Brown co-presented the 2018 edition of the BBC Young Jazz Musician of the Year for television, transmitted on BBC 4. In the same year, apart from interviews across the world while on tour, she appeared on a number of bespoke and established UK television programmes. They included guesting on editions of Celebrity Mastermind, Gareth Malone's All-Star Music Quiz, and an episode of Celebrity Eggheads.

Across television and radio, Brown has interviewed Gregory Porter, Frank Skinner, Sophie Ellis Bextor, Lauren Child, Liam Charles, Amanda Abbington, Adrian Dunbar, Dame Evelyn Glennie, Ruthie Henshall to name a few.

In 2019, a 20-episode BBC series YolanDa's Band Jam began transmission on CBeebies. The second series was released on Sky in 2020.

In 2020 she began hosting a weekend show on Jazz FM.

In August 2022, Brown covered an early evening music show for Jo Whiley on BBC Radio 2 for a week.

Honours
Brown was appointed Officer of the Order of the British Empire (OBE) in the 2023 New Year Honours for services to music, music education and broadcasting.

 Personal life 
Brown lives in Chigwell with her husband, a music promoter and restaurateur, and their two daughters Jemima and Adelphi. She is a motor racing enthusiast, loves football and supports Newcastle United. She was one of eleven individuals appointed a  Deputy lieutenant of Greater London on 11 October 2022.

Discography

EPs and albums
 YolanDa Brown, Finding my voice (2007 CD - Black Grape Productions)
 A Step Closer (2008 EP release – Black Grape Productions) 
 April Showers, May Flowers (February 2012 Album release – Black Grape Records)
 April Showers, May Flowers-Live Sessions (May 2013 Album release CD/DVD – Black Grape Records)
 Love Politics War (June 2017 Album release CD/digital/Vinyl – Black Grape Records)
 YolanDa’s Band Jam (January 2021 Album release Digital– Sony Music Magic Star)

Awards and nominations

References

External links
 
 YolanDa Brown on Saturday on Jazz FM
 Drake YolanDa Award website
 London Saxophone Festival website
 YolanDa Brown on BBC Woman's Hour, February 2012
 YolanDa Brown interview by Pete Lewis, Blues & Soul'', June 2009.

1982 births
21st-century English women musicians
21st-century saxophonists
Black British musicians
British women radio presenters
British women television presenters
English jazz saxophonists
English people of Jamaican descent
English radio presenters
English television presenters
Jazz fusion saxophonists
Living people
Musicians from London
Officers of the Order of the British Empire
People educated at Bancroft's School
Smooth jazz saxophonists
University of Oviedo alumni
Women jazz saxophonists